Point MacKenzie is a census-designated place (CDP) in Matanuska-Susitna Borough, Alaska, United States. It is part of the Anchorage, Alaska Metropolitan Statistical Area. At the 2020 census the population was 1,852, up from 529 in 2010.

Geography
Point MacKenzie is located at  (61.374982, -149.912390).

History
In the book Shem Pete's Alaska, a collection of recollections about the lives of Upper Cook Inlet Dena'ina Athabascans, Point MacKenzie is identified as Dilhi Tunch’del’usht Beydegh, (“Point where we transport hooligan”), a trade site where the Dghelay Teht'ana ("The Mountain People") of the Talkeetna Mountains would trade with the Dena'ina of the Knik Arm.

Seward's Success was once proposed to be constructed here in the 1970s.

Demographics

Point MacKenzie first reported on the 1960 U.S. Census as the unincorporated village of "McKenzie Point." At the time, it was within Anchorage Borough, which extended across to the west side of Knik Arm. It was later drawn into Matanuska-Susitna Borough. It did not report again until 2000, when it returned as Point MacKenzie, and was made a census-designated place (CDP).

As of the census of 2000, there were 111 people, 39 households, and 26 families residing in the CDP. The racial makeup of the CDP was 91.89% White, 0.90% Black or African American, 3.60% Native American, 1.80% Asian, and 1.80% from two or more races.

There were 39 households, out of which 25.6% had children under the age of 18 living with them, 61.5% were married couples living together, and 30.8% were non-families. 17.9% of all households were made up of individuals, and none had someone living alone who was 65 years of age or older. The average household size was 2.85 and the average family size was 3.26.

In the CDP, the population was spread out, with 28.8% under the age of 18, 8.1% from 18 to 24, 29.7% from 25 to 44, 26.1% from 45 to 64, and 7.2% who were 65 years of age or older. The median age was 38 years. For every 100 females, there were 126.5 males. For every 100 females age 18 and over, there were 154.8 males.

The median income for a household in the CDP was $23,250, and the median income for a family was $69,688. Males had a median income of $46,563 versus $0 for females. The per capita income for the CDP was $23,228. There were 17.4% of families and 22.7% of the population living below the poverty line, including no under eighteens and none of those over 64.

References

Anchorage metropolitan area
Census-designated places in Alaska
Census-designated places in Matanuska-Susitna Borough, Alaska
Populated coastal places in Alaska on the Pacific Ocean